Nizhnegerasimovsky is a rural locality (a khutor) in Tryokhostrovskoye Rural Settlement, Ilovlinsky District, Volgograd Oblast, Russia. The population was 52 as of 2010. There are 7 streets.

Geography 
Nizhnegerasimovsky is located in steppe, on the Don River, on south of the Volga Upland, 53 km south of Ilovlya (the district's administrative centre) by road. Donskoy is the nearest rural locality.

References 

Rural localities in Ilovlinsky District